A bird hide (blind or bird blind in North America) is a shelter, often camouflaged, that is used to observe wildlife, especially birds, at close quarters. Although hides or hunting blinds were once built chiefly as hunting aids, they are now commonly found in parks and wetlands for the use of birdwatchers, ornithologists and other observers who do not want to disturb wildlife as it is being observed.

A typical bird hide resembles a garden shed, with small openings, shutters, or windows built into at least one side to enable observation. However, because birds do not recognize humans as predatory threats unless the human is standing in the open, a bird blind can be little more than a large shed open on one side in which birders stand, and motor vehicles are effective blinds even with the windows open.

Variants 
Types of bird hide include:
 tower hides, which have multiple stories and allow observations over large areas.
 bird blinds, which are screens similar to one wall of a typical hide, with or without a roof for shelter.
 machans, covered platforms erected to observe birds and wildlife in high trees or on cliffs, particularly in India where they were originally used by tiger-hunters.
 portable hides, tent-like structures made of fabric arranged on a frame, often used by photographers.

References

External links

 Birds Australia Information Sheet No.8

Birdwatching
Ornithological equipment and methods